These are the official results of the Women's Long Jump event at the 1996 Summer Olympics in Atlanta, Georgia. There were a total of 50 competitors, with two non-starters. Iva Prandzheva from Bulgaria, ranking 7th with 6.82 was disqualified because of doping.

Medalists

Abbreviations
All results shown are in metres

Results

Qualification
Qualification Rules: Qualifying performance 6.70 (Q) or at least 12 best performers (q) advance to the Final.

Final

See also
 1995 Women's World Championships Long Jump
 1997 Women's World Championships Long Jump

References

External links
 Official Report
 Results

L
Long jump at the Olympics
1996 in women's athletics
Women's events at the 1996 Summer Olympics